The Team event competition of the 2016 European Aquatics Championships was held on 9 May 2016.

Results
The final was held at 19:30.

References

Diving
European Aquatics Championships